Jiufengia is an extinct genus of therocephalian in the family Akidnognathidae. It is known from a single species, Jiufengia jiai, from the Late Permian Naobaogou Formation in China.

References 

Therocephalia genera
Akidnognathids
Eutherocephalians